Jantzen is a clothing company based in Portland, Oregon, United States.

Jantzen may also refer to:

People with surname Jantzen

 Christian Jantzen, an Australian sports journalist
 Grace Jantzen (1948–2006), a British philosopher and theologian
 Heinie  Jantzen (1890–1948), an American Major League Baseball player
 Hermann Jantzen (1866–1959), a Mennonite missionary to Russian Turkestan
 Jens Carsten Jantzen, a German mathematician
 Jesse Jantzen, an American wrestler
 Robert A. Jantzen, Director of the United States Fish and Wildlife Service from 1981 to 1986

Other
 Jantzen & Thormählen, a defunct German company that operated in Cameroon
 Jantzen Beach, a former amusement park in Portland, Oregon, U.S., and later the site of a shopping center
 Jantzen Knitting Mills Company Building, in Portland, Oregon, listed on the U.S. National Register of Historic Places
 Jantzen filtration, a mathematical filtration
 The Stephan Jantzen, a German icebreaker ship
 The Italian ship MV_Sebastiano_Veniero_(1940) originally sailed as the Dutch ship Jason and was referred to in some German records as the Jantzen.

See also
 Janzen
 Jansen (disambiguation)
 Janssen (disambiguation)